Esomus manipurensis is a species of cyprinid endemic to drainages in Manipur in India.

References

Freshwater fish of India
Fish described in 1990
Esomus

Archive 

Description of a new rasborine fish, Esomus manipurensis from Manipur, India by Raj Tilak; Seema Jain 1990